General Gillis le Fèvre de Montigny (18 December 1901 – 1 January 1982) was a Dutch military officer who served as Chairman of the United Defence Staff of the Armed Forces of the Netherlands between 1962 and 1965.

References

External links 
 

1901 births
1982 deaths
Royal Netherlands Army generals
Royal Netherlands Army officers
Chiefs of the Defence Staff (Netherlands)